Fanuel Massingue (born 19 December 1982) is Mozambican international footballer who plays for HCB Songo in Moçambola. He was called to Mozambique national football team at the 2010 Africa Cup of Nations.

References

External links 
 

Living people
1982 births
Sportspeople from Maputo
Mozambican footballers
Mozambique international footballers
Association football defenders
C.D. Maxaquene players
Liga Desportiva de Maputo players
FC Chibuto players
UD Songo players
GD Maputo players
2010 Africa Cup of Nations players